Kerry August Justin (born May 3, 1955 in New Orleans, Louisiana) was a cornerback for the Seattle Seahawks (1978–83 and 1986–87). He played college football at Oregon State University. He also played for the New Jersey Generals of the USFL in 1984 and 1985.

In eight seasons, he had seven interceptions returned for 31 yards and three blocked punts which remains a team record.

1955 births
Living people
American football cornerbacks
Oregon State Beavers football players
Seattle Seahawks players
New Jersey Generals players
Players of American football from New Orleans